Scott Cochran (born March 21, 1979) is an American football coach who is the special teams coordinator for the Georgia Bulldogs. He won eight national championships throughout his coaching career. He also worked in the NBA as an assistant strength coach for the New Orleans Hornets.

Coaching career

LSU
Scott began his coaching career at his alma mater Louisiana State University where he served as a graduate assistant from 2001 to 2002. In 2003 he was named an assistant strength and conditioning coach for the team and won his first national championship under Nick Saban.

Hornets

The New Orleans native began working for his hometown NBA team the Hornets in 2004 as an assistant strength and conditioning coach and remained there until the end of the 2006–07 season.

Alabama

In 2007 Scott reunited with Saban and became a part of his inaugural Alabama staff as the team's head strength and conditioning coach. There he won an additional five national championships and remained with the team until the end of the 2019 season after growing tension with coach Saban.

Georgia

In 2020 Scott joined Kirby Smart’s Georgia coaching staff as the team's special teams coordinator. Cochran was part of the Georgia staff that won the National Championship in the 2021 season over Alabama. He won his second title with Georgia when they defeated TCU in the National Championship.

Personal life

Scott and his wife Cissy Schepens have three children.

References

1979 births
Living people
Coaches of American football from Louisiana
Louisiana State University alumni
LSU Tigers football coaches
Alabama Crimson Tide football coaches
Georgia Bulldogs football coaches